The 2006–07 Crown Prince Cup was the 32nd season of the Saudi premier knockout tournament since its establishment in 1957. It started with the Qualifying Rounds on 30 November 2006 and concluded with the final on 27 April 2007.

Premier League side Al-Hilal were the defending champions, but they were eliminated by Al-Ahli in the Semi-finals. Al-Ahli won their fifth Crown Prince Cup title and their first since 2002. As winners of the tournament, Al-Ahli qualified for the 2008 AFC Champions League group stage.

Qualifying rounds
All of the competing teams that are not members of the Premier League competed in the qualifying rounds to secure one of 4 available places in the Round of 16. The qualifying competition began on 30 November 2006.

First round
Source: Al-Jazirah.

Second round

Final Round

Bracket

Round of 16
The Round of 16 fixtures were played on 21, 22, 23 and 25 February 2007. All times are local, AST (UTC+3).

Quarter-finals
The Quarter-finals fixtures were played on 2, 3 and 4 March 2007. All times are local, AST (UTC+3).

Semi-finals
The Semi-finals first legs were played on 18 March and 1 April 2007 while the second legs were played on 5 and 7 April 2007. The first leg of the Al-Ahli v Al-Hilal match up was moved to 18 March due to Al-Ahli's participation in the semi-finals of the 2006–07 Arab Champions League. All times are local, AST (UTC+3).

|}

Matches

Al-Ittihad won 4–2 on aggregate.

Al-Ahli won 3–1 on aggregate.

Final

The final was held on 27 April 2007. All times are local, AST (UTC+3).

Top goalscorers
As of 27 April 2007

See also
 2006–07 Saudi Premier League
 2008 AFC Champions League

References

Saudi Crown Prince Cup seasons
2006–07 domestic association football cups
Crown Prince Cup